Vampiri (trans. The Vampires) are a Serbian and Yugoslav rock band from Belgrade. The band was formed in 1990, and performed music influenced by the 1950s doo-wop and rockabilly. After releasing two studio albums, they disbanded in 1993. The band reunited in 1995, releasing two more albums, second of which featured harder rock sound, only to disband again in 1998. In 2012, the band reunited once again.

History

Band formation (1988-1990) 
The idea of forming a band came in 1988 as a collaboration between the Lollypops and Baby Boom members. Together, former Lollypops member Aleksandar Eraković (vocals), former Baby Boom members Dejan Pejović (backing vocals) and Dušan Pavlović (guitar), Goran Redžepi (drums) Dušan Varda (both backing vocals), made several demo recordings. Previously, Eraković, Pejović, and Pavlović went together to the Belgrade school for industrial design (1986-1988), which is where they met. In September 1989 Eraković, Pejović, Pavlović and Redžepi all went to serve the Yugoslav People's Army. On their return from the army service, the two bands merged with Eraković as the lead vocalist, being officially formed as a band in 1990. Other members which joined the band were Dejan Petrović (backing vocals), Dejan Jovanović (bass guitar).

Mainstream success, first breakup (1990-1993) 
One of the last demo recordings the band had made was a cover of "Rama lama ding dong" of The Edsels. An earlier demo version of the song was made in 1988. In June 1990, a promotional video was made for the song, shot partially on the roof of the cinema 20 October and partially at the Kalemegdan Fortress in Belgrade. Soon after, the video was broadcast by the national television, making it an immediate hit. At the time, the band started being regularly broadcast on radio stations. In the late 1990, the band entered the studio to record three songs, "Lea", "Anđela" and "Malena" ("Little Girl"), which were produced by Saša Habić. It was only then that PGP-RTB agreed to release the band's debut album.

The debut album Rama lama ding dong was recorded during the winter of late 1990 and early 1991 and published in April 1991. For the album recording Borko Borac (saxophone) and Dejan Tomović (keyboards) joined the band, but both left the band after the release. The album was mostly doo-wop-oriented, and brought hits such as "Malena", "Hajde, hajde" ("Come On, Come On"), "Ove noći" ("This Night"), "Sve što želim to su sni" ("Everything I Wish for Are the Dreams") and a rerecorded version of the title track. It also featured a cover of Carlo and The Belmonts' song "Little Orphan Girl" with lyrics in Serbian language entitled "San letnje noći" ("A Midsummer Night's Dream"). Guitarist Branko Potonjak, keyboardist Sloba Marković and saxophone player Jova Maljoković made guest appearances on the album. During the same year, the band made the guest appearance on the Tonny Montano album Lovac na novac (Money Hunter), singing backing vocals.

The band's first major live appearance was as an opening act on the Vaya Con Dios concert in Sava Centar in July 1991. In the spring of 1991, they appeared at the Belgrade Spring festival performing a cover of Đorđe Marjanović's song "Beograde" ("Belgrade"), included in the festival official compilation released during the same year. With the song "Meni njena ljubav treba" ("I Need Her Love") they won the first place at MESAM festival, and got the Discovery of the Year Award . Their second album Tačno u ponoć (High Midnight) brought the sound similar to the one on the debut. It was recorded during the winter of 1991 and produced by Oliver Jovanović.

By 1992, the band already had more than hundred live appearances, and in the summer of the same year, it went on a joint tour with Neverne Bebe. The band also performed at the students protests against the regime of Slobodan Milošević, in May 1992, and for the occasion the band performed a cover version of Zdravko Čolić song "Glavo luda" ("Crazy Head"). At the time, former Graffiti member Dragan Novaković became the new bassist, replacing Dejan Jovanović, and, by the end of 1992, Saša Petrov became the new guitarist, making the band a ten-piece.  In May 1992, the band performed at the last Jugovizija festival with the song "Ding ding dong", winning the second place. At the time, the band also recorded the music for the film We Are Not Angels by Srđan Dragojević, released in 1993 by ZAM, on the Be-be (Ba-bies) EP. It featured ten songs, including the title track, for which Srđan Dragojević wrote the song lyrics, and "Poziv na ples" ("Dance Invitation"), a cover version of the Beatles song "I Saw Her Standing There"  In October 1993, most likely due to the economic situation in the country, the band ceased to exist.

Reformation (1995-1998) 
In 1995 the rereformed Vampiri released Plavi grad (Blue City), recorded at the O studio in autumn of 1994, with a new lineup, featuring Aleksandar Eraković (vocals), Dejan Tomović (keyboards), Dragan Novaković (bass guitar), Saša Petrov (guitar) and Srđan Milenković (drums). The album featured hits "Plavi grad", "Stari voz" ("Old Train"), "Neću" ("I Won't") and "Ona i ja" ("She and I", cover of The Searchers' "Needles and Pins"). Despite having several hit songs, the album was not commercially successful. In Autumn 1997, the band started recording a new album, released by Komuna in 1998. Moving towards more diverse genres of rock, Monkey Food featured the title track, a cover of Spencer Davis Group song "I'm a Man", "Sedmi deo" ("Seventh Part"), for which Kornelije Kovač appeared as guest keyboardist, "Budi se" ("Wake Up"), for which guitarist Saša Petrov did the lead vocals, and "Svoj" ("My Own"), featuring guest appearance by Jovan Maljoković on saxophone. The album featured Jožef Pisanović (guitar), Srđan Jovanović (drums) and Saša Filićić (bass guitar) as new members. After the album release, the band disbanded.

Post breakup (1999-2011) 
After the disbandment of Vampiri, in 1994, Dejan Petrović, Dejan Pejović and Goran Redžepi formed the ska supergroup Familija with former U Škripcu members. The band released their debut album Narodno pozorište (People's Theater) in 1995, after which Redžepi left the band. The remaining members released the album Seljačka buna (Peasants' Rebellion) and disbanded in 1998.

In 2003, Pejović formed The Dibidus with former Deca Loših Muzičara guitarist Jova Jović and former Hush bassist Milan Sarić. In 2007, Petrov became the member of the band. On their 2011 album Trenerka i sako (Suit Jacket and Tracksuit), The Dibidus recorded a cover of Vampiri song "Pokloniću joj nebo" ("I'll Give Her the Sky"), originally released on Be-Be. Dejan Petrović, with his brother Nenad, formed the band Centrala whose style was a combination of electronic music with rock.

Vocalist Eraković founded the Rama Lama Studio in Belgrade and formed the Beatles tribute band The Bestbeat, in 2005. In 1999, he made a guest keyboard appearance on the Orthodox Celts album Green Roses.

Guitarist Dušan Pavlović received his PhD in 2002 from the Central European University in Budapest in the field of political philosophy and theory. Since 2005, he has taught at the Faculty of Political Science at the University of Belgrade. He was a columnist for the newspaper Politika. In 2014, he was one of the forming members of the political movement Enough is Enough, and in 2016 he became a deputy in the National Assembly of Serbia

Reformation (2012-present) 
In 2012, Eraković reformed Vampiri. Beside the frontman Aleksandar Eraković the lineup also featured the keyboard player Dejan Tomović "Tomke" from the second incarnation of the band, as well as new members, Damjan Dašić (drums and backing vocals), Marko Ćalić (bass), both Eraković's bandmates in their Beatles tribute act The Bestbeat,. Dašić's younger brother Nemanja (guitar) and Andreja Bućan (saxophone and backing vocals). On January 10, the band held their first concert after reunion, in Negotin, and on February 11 the band held a concert in Belgrade's Sava Centar. The Belgrade concert featured numerous guests: Toni Montano, Plavi Orkestar frontman Saša Lošić, and actors Uroš Đurić and Srđan Todorović (who both starred in We Are Not Angels). As a tribute to late Milan Delčić "Delča", on the concert Vampiri performed U Škripcu song "Koliko imaš godina" ("How Old Are You").

In December 2013, the band released the single "Put za pravi put" ("The Way to the Right Way"), announcing their upcoming studio album. By then, Damjan Dašić and Marko Ćalić were no longer in the band and new members were Branko Bjelica on drums and Jovan Janacković on bass. Eraković was, in turn, no longer a part of The Bestbeat. The two shortly formed a band for their own work featuring Dašić on vocals and Ćalić on guitar, Magic Bush, and have since worked with many large names in Serbian music.

"Put za pravi put" was eventually deleted from YouTube and re-uploaded to the band's official channel in 2015, with a music video and has been the only post-1990s release by Vampiri as of 2020. Tomović was eventually replaced by another member who was in turn replaced by Nikola Nemešević Nemeš in 2019. A founding member of the band, Goran Redžepi "Gedža" passed away in January 2019.

As of 2018, the band implied multiple times that they were in the studio, recording a long-awaited follow-up to Monkey Food.

In 2022, the band released their first album since the 1990s, Letimo.

Discography

Studio albums
Rama lama ding dong (1991)
Tačno u ponoć (1991)
Plavi grad (1995)
Monkey Food (1998)
Letimo (2022)

EPs
Be-be (1993)

Other appearances
"Beograde" (Hitovi Beogradskog proleća, 1991)

References

Bibliography
 EX YU ROCK enciklopedija 1960-2006, Janjatović Petar;

External links 
 Vampiri at Myspace
 Vampiri at YouTube
 Vampiri at Discogs
 Vampiri at Last.fm
 Vampiri at Rateyourmusic

Serbian rock music groups
Serbian pop rock music groups
Yugoslav rock music groups
Doo-wop groups
Musical groups from Belgrade
Musical groups established in 1988
Musical groups disestablished in 1998